The 1967 Pittsburgh Panthers football team represented the University of Pittsburgh in the 1967 NCAA University Division football season.  The team compiled a 1–9 record under head coach Dave Hart. The team's statistical leaders included Bob Bazylak with 679 passing yards and Gary Cramer with 312 rushing yards.

Schedule

References

Pittsburgh
Pittsburgh Panthers football seasons
Pittsburgh Panthers football